Zagreb is the capital and largest city in Croatia.

Zagreb may also refer to:
 187700 Zagreb, an asteroid discovered in 2008
 NK Zagreb, an association football team
 KK Zagreb, a basketball team
 RK Zagreb, a handball team
 Zagreb (horse)
 Yugoslav destroyer Zagreb